Creully sur Seulles (literally Creully on Seulles) is a commune in the department of Calvados, northwestern France. The municipality was established on 1 January 2017 by merger of the former communes of Creully (the seat), Saint-Gabriel-Brécy and Villiers-le-Sec.

Population

See also 
Communes of the Calvados department

References 

Communes of Calvados (department)